Gusu (Gussum, Baw) is an East Kainji language of Nigeria belonging to the Shammo cluster. 
It is spoken in Toro LGA, Bauchi State and in Bassa LGA, Plateau State.

References

East Kainji languages
Languages of Nigeria